Ally Hunter (born 4 October 1949 in Glasgow) is a Scottish former football goalkeeper, who played for Kilmarnock, Celtic, Motherwell, St Mirren and Scotland.

His longest service was four seasons at Kilmarnock between 1969 and 1973.

As well as four full caps, Hunter played for the Scottish League XI once, in 1972.

References

External links 

1949 births
Living people
Footballers from Glasgow
Association football goalkeepers
Scottish footballers
Johnstone Burgh F.C. players
Kilmarnock F.C. players
Celtic F.C. players
Motherwell F.C. players
St Mirren F.C. players
Clydebank F.C. (1965) players
Scottish Football League players
Scotland international footballers
Scottish Football League representative players
Scotland under-23 international footballers
Drumchapel Amateur F.C. players
Scottish Junior Football Association players